Robert Herbin (30 March 1939 – 27 April 2020) was a French football defender and manager.

A one-club man as a player AS Saint-Étienne, he later managed the team for eleven years. He won five Ligue 1 titles as a player and four as a manager, and his team lost the 1976 European Cup Final to FC Bayern Munich at Hampden Park.

Born in Paris, he moved to Nice as a child as his father played trombone at the Opéra de Nice. He moved from a local club to Saint-Étienne at age 18, for 2.5 million French francs (around €3,600 in 2020).

Herbin was dismissed by Saint-Étienne in February 1983 amidst the slush fund scandal that ended their period of national dominance. He was instantly hired by their Rhone derby rivals Olympique Lyonnais and could not prevent their relegation three months later, going on to spend two seasons in Ligue 2 with them. After a big-money job with Al-Nassr FC in Saudi Arabia and work with RC Strasbourg Alsace, he returned to Saint-Étienne in 1987 but was unable to restore their success over the next three years.

He was recognisable for his large red hair, and for his reserved personality he was known as "Le Sphinx". In retirement, he lived alone with his dog near Saint-Étienne and avoided social events, while also suffering from alcohol and tobacco abuse.

References

External links
Profile
Profile on French federation official site

1939 births
2020 deaths
Footballers from Paris
French footballers
France international footballers
Association football defenders
AS Saint-Étienne players
Ligue 1 players
1960 European Nations' Cup players
1966 FIFA World Cup players
French football managers
AS Saint-Étienne managers
Olympique Lyonnais managers
RC Strasbourg Alsace managers
Red Star F.C. managers
Ligue 1 managers
Al Nassr FC managers